Hans Müller (22 December 1915 – 30 April 1967) was a Swiss boxer. He competed in the men's heavyweight event at the 1948 Summer Olympics.

References

1915 births
1967 deaths
Heavyweight boxers
Swiss male boxers
Olympic boxers of Switzerland
Boxers at the 1948 Summer Olympics
Place of birth missing